The 2016 Telekom S-League is the 13th season of the Telekom S-League in the Solomon Islands. All matches are played at the hillside ground called Lawson Tama Stadium, with an approximate capacity of 20,000.

Standings

References

Solomon Islands S-League seasons
Solomon
football